Liberian International Shipping & Corporate Registry FC, abbreviated to LISCR FC, is a football (soccer) club from Liberia based in Gardnersville, Montserrado County. They play their home matches at the Antoinette Tubman Stadium in central Monrovia. They have won the Liberia Football Association Knockout three times and the Liberia Super Cup trophy twice. They won the premiership title for the first time in their history in the 2010–11 season and retained the title the following season (2011–12). LISCR became the last winner of the Liberia Premier league before the dissolution of the league to the first division by the Liberia Football Association. After five years of the dissolution of the Premiership, they won the new first division for the first time in 2017 after finishing top of the 2016-17 Liberia First Division League table with an unbeaten record.

Early history
The club was formed on August 24, 1995 as Young Barcelona by its president, Mustapha I. Raji. 
The club first appearance in Liberian football was in the Gardnersville Sub-committee. It ended the 1995-96 season as the champions of the 4th division and qualified to the 3rd division of the Gardnersville sub-committee league.
In 1997 the club emerged as champions of the 3rd division but failed in the process to qualify to the division 2 category the following season. The club continued with its campaign in getting to the 2nd division as crowned champions of the 3rd division in 1998. 
The team earned a well-deserved position in Liberian football after winning the Liberia Football Association 2nd division championship in 1999 and gained promotion to the 1st division and later got promotion to Liberia Football Association Premier League in 2000.

Premier League and First Division
As a club in the Liberian Premier League LISCR FC won its first trophy in 2004 when they won the Liberian FA Cup. The following year, 2005, the team won its second Liberian FA Cup trophy. Six years after winning its second Liberian FA Cup, LISCR won the 2010-11 Liberian Premiership and represented Liberia in the 2012 CAF Champions League where they were knocked out by Ghanaian club, Berekum Chelsea in the preliminary round. They won their second premiership title the following season (2011–12) and again represented Liberia in the 2013 CAF Champions League. They were drawn against Union Douala of Cameroon. Again, the club was knocked out in the preliminary round by Cameroonian side as they failed to reach the first round qualifiers.
After winning two consecutive premiership titles, the Liberia Football Association cancelled the Premier league upon FIFA recommendation which is now in the First division of the Liberia Football Association. 
Before the start of the 2016-17 season, the club signed Gambian coach, Mustapha Manneh who led the club to an unbeaten league run. The club won the new First Division title in style as they finish the 2016-17 First Division League unbeaten, becoming the first and only Liberian club to win the league unbeaten. From 22 matches, the team was able to obtain 10 wins and 12 draws as they ended the league season with 42 points. The 2016-17 season turned out to be the best in the club history by winning double championship. They climaxed the 2016-17 season by winning the Liberia Football Association FA Cup.

Unbeaten league run
The club became the first and only club in Liberia to win the top flight league and any league without conceding defeat. They won the 2016-17 Liberia First Division with an unbeaten record in 22 matches. The club managed 10 wins and 12 draws to complete the league season without defeat.

Achievements
Liberian Premier League/ First Division: 32010–11, 2011–12, 2016-17.LFA Cup: 52004, 2005, 2016-17, 2019, 2022.Super Cup: 42004, 2011, 2018, 2022

Performance in CAF competitionsCAF Champions League: 3 appearances2012 – Preliminary Round
2013 – Preliminary Round
2018 - Preliminary RoundCAF Cup: 1 appearance'''
2003 – Withdrew in First Round

Current squad

 (On loan from Central Parade)

 (On loan from East End Lions )

Current technical staff

Administrative staff
Club President: Mustapha Raji
Vice President: Ignatius Kikeh
Secretary General: Swen Bedell
Public Relations Officer: T. Kla Wesley Jr.

References

External links

 
Football clubs in Liberia
Sport in Monrovia
Association football clubs established in 1995
1995 establishments in Liberia